In nine-dimensional geometry, a nine-dimensional polytope or 9-polytope is a polytope contained by 8-polytope facets. Each 7-polytope ridge being shared by exactly two 8-polytope facets.

A uniform 9-polytope is one which is vertex-transitive, and constructed from uniform 8-polytope facets.

Regular 9-polytopes 

Regular 9-polytopes can be represented by the Schläfli symbol {p,q,r,s,t,u,v,w}, with w {p,q,r,s,t,u,v} 8-polytope facets around each peak.

There are exactly three such convex regular 9-polytopes:
 {3,3,3,3,3,3,3,3} - 9-simplex
 {4,3,3,3,3,3,3,3} - 9-cube
 {3,3,3,3,3,3,3,4} - 9-orthoplex

There are no nonconvex regular 9-polytopes.

Euler characteristic 

The topology of any given 9-polytope is defined by its Betti numbers and torsion coefficients.

The value of the Euler characteristic used to characterise polyhedra does not generalize usefully to higher dimensions, whatever their underlying topology. This inadequacy of the Euler characteristic to reliably distinguish between different topologies in higher dimensions led to the discovery of the more sophisticated Betti numbers.

Similarly, the notion of orientability of a polyhedron is insufficient to characterise the surface twistings of toroidal polytopes, and this led to the use of torsion coefficients.

Uniform 9-polytopes by fundamental Coxeter groups 

Uniform 9-polytopes with reflective symmetry can be generated by these three Coxeter groups, represented by permutations of rings of the Coxeter-Dynkin diagrams:

Selected regular and uniform 9-polytopes from each family include:
 Simplex family: A9 [38] - 
 271 uniform 9-polytopes as permutations of rings in the group diagram, including one regular:
 {38} - 9-simplex or deca-9-tope or decayotton - 
 Hypercube/orthoplex family: B9 [4,38] - 
 511 uniform 9-polytopes as permutations of rings in the group diagram, including two regular ones:
 {4,37} - 9-cube or enneract - 
 {37,4} - 9-orthoplex or enneacross - 
 Demihypercube D9 family: [36,1,1] - 
 383 uniform 9-polytope as permutations of rings in the group diagram, including:
 {31,6,1} - 9-demicube or demienneract, 161 - ; also as h{4,38} .
 {36,1,1} - 9-orthoplex, 611 -

The A9 family 

The A9 family has symmetry of order 3628800 (10 factorial).

There are 256+16-1=271 forms based on all permutations of the Coxeter-Dynkin diagrams with one or more rings. These are all enumerated below. Bowers-style acronym names are given in parentheses for cross-referencing.

The B9 family 

There are 511 forms based on all permutations of the Coxeter-Dynkin diagrams with one or more rings.

Eleven cases are shown below: Nine rectified forms and 2 truncations. Bowers-style acronym names are given in parentheses for cross-referencing. Bowers-style acronym names are given in parentheses for cross-referencing.

The D9 family 

The D9 family has symmetry of order 92,897,280 (9 factorial × 28).

This family has 3×128−1=383 Wythoffian uniform polytopes, generated by marking one or more nodes of the D9 Coxeter-Dynkin diagram. Of these, 255 (2×128−1) are repeated from the B9 family and 128 are unique to this family, with the eight 1 or 2 ringed forms listed below. Bowers-style acronym names are given in parentheses for cross-referencing.

Regular and uniform honeycombs 

There are five fundamental affine Coxeter groups that generate regular and uniform tessellations in 8-space:

Regular and uniform tessellations include:
  45 uniquely ringed forms
8-simplex honeycomb: {3[9]} 
  271 uniquely ringed forms
 Regular 8-cube honeycomb: {4,36,4}, 
 8-demicube honeycomb: h{4,36,4} or {31,1,35,4},  or 
 , [31,1,34,31,1]: 155 unique ring permutations, and 15 are new, the first, Coxeter called a quarter 8-cubic honeycomb, representing as q{4,36,4}, or qδ9.
  511 forms
 521 honeycomb:
 251 honeycomb: 
 152 honeycomb:

Regular and uniform hyperbolic honeycombs 

There are no compact hyperbolic Coxeter groups of rank 9, groups that can generate honeycombs with all finite facets, and a finite vertex figure. However, there are 4 paracompact hyperbolic Coxeter groups of rank 9, each generating uniform honeycombs in 8-space as permutations of rings of the Coxeter diagrams.

References 

 T. Gosset: On the Regular and Semi-Regular Figures in Space of n Dimensions, Messenger of Mathematics, Macmillan, 1900
 A. Boole Stott: Geometrical deduction of semiregular from regular polytopes and space fillings, Verhandelingen of the Koninklijke academy van Wetenschappen width unit Amsterdam, Eerste Sectie 11,1, Amsterdam, 1910
 H.S.M. Coxeter:
 H.S.M. Coxeter, M.S. Longuet-Higgins und J.C.P. Miller: Uniform Polyhedra, Philosophical Transactions of the Royal Society of London, Londne, 1954
 H.S.M. Coxeter, Regular Polytopes, 3rd Edition, Dover New York, 1973
 Kaleidoscopes: Selected Writings of H.S.M. Coxeter, edited by F. Arthur Sherk, Peter McMullen, Anthony C. Thompson, Asia Ivic Weiss, Wiley-Interscience Publication, 1995,  
 (Paper 22) H.S.M. Coxeter, Regular and Semi Regular Polytopes I, [Math. Zeit. 46 (1940) 380–407, MR 2,10]
 (Paper 23) H.S.M. Coxeter, Regular and Semi-Regular Polytopes II, [Math. Zeit. 188 (1985) 559-591]
 (Paper 24) H.S.M. Coxeter, Regular and Semi-Regular Polytopes III, [Math. Zeit. 200 (1988) 3-45]
 N.W. Johnson: The Theory of Uniform Polytopes and Honeycombs, Ph.D. Dissertation, University of Toronto, 1966

External links 
 Polytope names
 Polytopes of Various Dimensions, Jonathan Bowers
 Multi-dimensional Glossary
 

9-polytopes